Alessia Russo (born 24 September 1996 in Figline Valdarno, Italy) is an Italian individual rhythmic gymnast. She is the 2019 Summer Universiade Ribbon silver medalist. On national level, she is a two-time (2018, 2019) Italian National All-around bronze medalist.

Career

Junior
She competed at the 2011 European Championships in Minsk, Belarus as a member of the Italian junior group. Together with Chiara Di Battista, Carmen Crescenzi, Alessia Medoro, Francesca Medoro and Valentina Savastio she placed 6th in Group All-around and 7th in 5 Ropes final.

Senior
She made her World Championship debut at the 2013 World Championships in Kyiv, Ukraine, placing 29th in All-around Qualifications. She also competed at the 2014 World Championships in Izmir, Turkey and finished 9th together with teammates Veronica Bertolini and Giulia di Luca.

In 2020, she started competing as captain of the Italian National reserve group.

References

External links 
 
 
 Alessia Russo on Gimnastika Pro

Living people
1996 births
Italian rhythmic gymnasts
Medalists at the 2019 Summer Universiade
Universiade silver medalists for Italy
Universiade medalists in gymnastics
Medalists at the Rhythmic Gymnastics World Championships
21st-century Italian women